GLEAM-X J162759.5-523504.3 is a transient astronomical radio source, found in 2020, in archival data recorded in 2018 by the Murchison Widefield Array.

The source was active in radio for about 1 minute every 18 minutes, from January to March 2018, but has not been recorded since.

Nature of source 
It seems somewhat like a Galactic Center radio transient (GCRT) except it is thought to be only about  distant.

The radio emissions were polarised (as if affected by a magnetic field) so it may be a predicted astrophysical object called an "ultra-long period magnetar".

See also 
 GCRT J1745−3009
 Rotating radio transients (RRATs)

Further reading 
  Not open access.

References

External links 

Radio astronomy
Sagittarius (constellation)